Home Town is an American television series starring husband and wife team, Ben and Erin Napier, that premiered on January 24, 2016 on HGTV. The married couple restores Southern homes in Laurel, Mississippi.  The fifth season of Home Town (sixteen episodes) began airing on January 3, 2021.

On January 4, 2021, a spin-off titled Home Town: Ben's Workshop premiered on Discovery+, and on May 2, 2021, a spin-off titled Home Town Takeover premiered.

Premise 
Erin and Ben Napier renovate houses in the historic district of Laurel, Mississippi. After being featured in Southern Weddings magazine and on the magazine's Instagram, they were contacted by HGTV. The show premiered in January 2016 and has been highly rated in the first three of the show's aired seasons.

Hosts 
Home Town is hosted by married couple Erin and Ben Napier.  The couple met while they were students at the University of Mississippi and were married in 2008.  They have two daughters, Helen, who was born in January 2018, and Mae, who was born on May 28, 2021.

Episodes

Series overview

Season 1 (2016–17)

Season 2 (2018)

Season 3 (2019)

Season 4 (2020)

Season 5 (2021)

Spin-offs

Home Town Takeover
On November 13, 2019, it was announced that a spin-off titled Home Town Takeover will premiere in 2021. The six-episode spinoff will feature the Napiers working with another community to renovate multiple homes and public spaces within a single town. It was announced on July 2, 2020, that Wetumpka, Alabama, will be the town featured in this new show. In 2022 the show will be filming in Fort Morgan, Colorado.

Home Town: Ben's Workshop
On December 3, 2020, it was announced that a spin-off titled Home Town: Ben's Workshop would premiere on January 4, 2021 on Discovery+.

References

External links



2010s American reality television series
2016 American television series debuts
2020s American reality television series
HGTV original programming
Interior design
Television shows set in Mississippi